Leona is a city in Doniphan County, Kansas, United States.  As of the 2020 census, the population of the city was 41.

History
Leona was laid out in 1873. The city was named for Leona Shock, the first baby born there.

A post office was opened in Leona in 1873, and remained in operation until it was discontinued in 1986.

Geography
Leona is located at  (39.785798, -95.322158), along the Wolf River.

Demographics

Leona is part of the St. Joseph, MO–KS Metropolitan Statistical Area.

2010 census
As of the census of 2010, there were 48 people, 14 households, and 11 families residing in the city. The racial makeup of the city was 93.8% White, 4.2% Native American, and 2.1% from two or more races.

There were 14 households, of which 57.1% had children under the age of 18 living with them, 50.0% were married couples living together, 14.3% had a female householder with no husband present, 14.3% had a male householder with no wife present, and 21.4% were non-families. 14.3% of all households were made up of individuals, and 7.1% had someone living alone who was 65 years of age or older. The average household size was 3.43 and the average family size was 3.64.

The median age in the city was 22 years. 39.6% of residents were under the age of 18; 14.6% were between the ages of 18 and 24; 31.3% were from 25 to 44; 12.5% were from 45 to 64; and 2.1% were 65 years of age or older. The gender makeup of the city was 56.3% male and 43.8% female.

2000 census
As of the census of 2000, there were 88 people, 29 households, and 20 families residing in the city. The racial makeup of the city was 93.18% White, 5.68% Native American, 1.14% from other races. Hispanic or Latino of any race were 1.14% of the population.

There were 29 households, out of which 34.5% had children under the age of 18 living with them, 31.0% were married couples living together, 27.6% had a female householder with no husband present, and 31.0% were non-families. 24.1% of all households were made up of individuals, and 3.4% had someone living alone who was 65 years of age or older. The average household size was 3.03 and the average family size was 3.40.

In the city, the population was spread out, with 34.1% under the age of 18, 6.8% from 18 to 24, 35.2% from 25 to 44, 10.2% from 45 to 64, and 13.6% who were 65 years of age or older. The median age was 29 years. For every 100 females, there were 125.6 males. For every 100 females age 18 and over, there were 107.1 males.

The median income for a household in the city was $12,143, and the median income for a family was $23,750. Males had a median income of $24,375 versus $11,250 for females. The per capita income for the city was $8,211. There were 40.0% of families and 58.4% of the population living below the poverty line, including 78.6% of under eighteens and 35.7% of those over 64.

Education
The community is served by Doniphan West USD 111 public school district.

References

Further reading

External links
 City of Leona
 Leona - Directory of Public Officials
 Leona city map, KDOT

Cities in Kansas
Cities in Doniphan County, Kansas
St. Joseph, Missouri metropolitan area
1873 establishments in Kansas
Populated places established in 1873